The White-Meyer House is a historic house, located at 1624 Crescent Place, Northwest, Washington, D.C. designed by American architect John Russell Pope and built by order of American ambassador Henry White. For several years, the house was rented to Eugene Meyer, who then bought it in 1934. It was bought by non-profit organization Meridian International Center in 1987.

History
Renowned architect John Russell Pope designed the house and completed it in 1912. Henry White, an American diplomat and a retired ambassador to Italy and France, purchased the property in 1910. He hosted numerous social events during his stay, inviting well-known guests, including Georges Clemenceau, Robert Cecil, Henry Cabot Lodge and President Warren Harding. 
In 1917, Henry White lent the house to the French mission of Marshal Joseph Joffre to use as its headquarters. While the French flag flew outside of the residence, Marshal Joffre used the house to host high-level strategic meetings. Many important conversations were had at the dining room table, including conversations that led to the establishment of the U.S Department of Health, Education and Welfare. When Henry White died, the house was passed on to his son John Campbell White. Financier Eugene Meyer rented the home while he was Chairman of the Federal Reserve (1930–1933), after which he bought the bankrupt Washington Post at auction. In 1934, Meyer bought the house from White for $355,000. During their ownership of the home, the Meyers hosted many prominent guests, including Eleanor Roosevelt, John F. Kennedy, Robert F. Kennedy, Adlai Stevenson, Thomas Mann, Earl Warren and Saul Alinsky.

After the Meyers' deaths, the house became the property of the Eugene and Agnes E. Meyer Foundation, which then leased the house to the Antioch Law School Library. In 1987, Meridian International Center purchased the property.

Timeline
 In 1918, Senator Peter G. Gerry rented the house.
 In the 1920s, President Warren Harding dined at the house.
 In 1922, Georges Clemenceau visited.
 In 1923 and 1925, Lord Robert Cecil visited.
 In 1927, John Campbell White inherited the house.
 In 1934, Eugene Meyer bought the house. 
 Charles A. Platt designed the remodeling.
 Eleanor Roosevelt, Adlai Stevenson, President John F. Kennedy, President Lyndon B. Johnson, Robert F. Kennedy, Ted Kennedy, Mayor Walter Washington and Saul Alinsky visited.
 In 1972, the Antioch School of Law rented the house.
 In 1987, Meridian House International (MHI) bought the house.

Architecture
White-Meyer house is considered historically significant due to its past guests and because architect John Russell Pope created it, the White- Meyer building was the first of the two houses created. It was designed and built between 1910 and 1912 the house totaled the cost of $155,547 dollars, the Georgian revival style mansion holds 40 rooms and sits atop Meridian Hill surrounded by a tall brick enclosure with an opening on the North side of Crescent Place. The garden plaza contains most of the original garden including yews, magnolias, weeping hemlocks and witch hazels that were originally planted by the Meyer family. A path of brick and pebbles leads to an iron gate with a circle, which represents the meridians and connects the White-Meyer House to the Meridian House. 
An extensive renovation of the house in 1988 won the American Institute Award for Excellence, the house's architectural integrity and original garden were preserved as much as possible the original fireplaces were preserved while the house's walls and ceilings were renovated. White-Meyer is listed on the National Register of Historic Places.

It was listed on the District of Columbia's Inventory of Historic Places in 1964.
It has been listed on NRHP since January 20, 1988.

See also
 Henry White 
 Eugene Meyer 
 John Russell Pope 
 Meridian International Center
 Meridian House

References

External links
 National Park Service
 Meridian International Center
 D.C. Preservation
"White-Meyer House (Washington D.C.)", wikimapia

Houses on the National Register of Historic Places in Washington, D.C.
Houses completed in 1912
Adams Morgan
1912 establishments in Washington, D.C.